Zephyrium or Zephyrion was a town of ancient Paphlagonia, located 60 stadia to the west of Cape Carambis, mentioned by several ancient authors.

Its site is located near Doğanyurt in Asiatic Turkey.

References

Populated places in ancient Paphlagonia
Former populated places in Turkey
History of Kastamonu Province
Roman Paphlagonia